Metal Generation: The Steeler Anthology was released by Majestic Rock Records in 2005 as a compilation album of the US heavy metal band Steeler.  The album was co-produced by a former band member, Ron Keel, as he believed there was a public desire for such an album (as he wrote on the album inserts).  In the album unreleased, live and single songs were added with a few of the songs of the band's only album Steeler. The song "Victim of the City" was later used by Malmsteen on his album Marching Out with the title "On the Run Again" with only minor changes other than the lyrics.

Track listing
 "Cold Day in Hell" **
 "Take Her Down" **
 "Ready to Explode" *
 "Hot on Your Heels" **
 "On the Rox" (Live)
 "Backseat Driver" (Live)
 "Victim of the City (Live)*
 "Yngwie is God" (Live)
 Band Introduction (Live)
 "Excited" (Live)*
 "Dying in Love" *
 "Last Chance to Rock" *
 "Metal Generation" * (bonus track, not present in all albums)
 "Serenade" (acoustic version by Ron Keel, recorded in 2005)

* Previously unreleased

** Original version

Steeler (American band) albums
2005 compilation albums